Each of the 50 states of the United States of America plus several of its territories and the District of Columbia issued individual passenger license plates for 2009.

Passenger baseplates

Non-passenger plates

See also

Antique vehicle registration
Electronic license plate
Motor vehicle registration
Vehicle license

References

External links

2009 in the United States
2009